Simona Sodini is an Italian former footballer who played as a striker.

Club career
Sodini won the Serie A in 1999 with ACF Milan. She was the championship's second top scorer in 2009.

She played three matches for Juventus in 2017–18 and became Italian champion.

International career 
Sodini was a member of the Italian national team, for which she played between 2002 and 2011.

References

External links
 

1982 births
Living people
People from Sassari
Italian women's footballers
Italy women's international footballers
Footballers from Sardinia
Juventus F.C. (women) players
Serie A (women's football) players
Women's association football forwards
ASD Femminile Inter Milano players
Sardinian women
Foroni Verona F.C. players